Kid Harold (March 22, 1899 - 1985) was a dancer, singer, and vaudeville comedy routine performer in Jamaica. He was part of vaudeville performances including as part of the Harold and Trim duo in the 1920s.

Kid Harold was born Harold Alexander Smith in Kingston. He performed for Edelweiss Amusement Company, an entertainment business established by Marcus Garvey in the early 1930s, that helped Kidd and other entertainers establish their careers.

Harold was known for his tap dancing performances. He also appeared in Ranny Williams' plays in Edelweiss Park. He was part of the Harold and Trim duo with Lionel Trim. Their comedic routine drew praise from the Jamaica Gleaner in 1927. The song and dance team was the earliest in a tradition of renowned comedy duo teams that performed in Jamaica from the 1920s until the 1960s.

References

1899 births
1985 deaths
Jamaican musicians
Vaudeville performers